Black Haw Township may refer to the following townships in the United States:

 Black Hawk Township, Black Hawk County, Iowa
 Black Hawk Township, Grundy County, Iowa
 Black Hawk Township, Jefferson County, Iowa
 Black Hawk Township, Miami County, Indiana, former name of Erie Township, Miami County, Indiana